Roseau County (pronounced row - so) is a county in the northwestern part of the U.S. state of Minnesota, along the Canada–US border. As of the 2020 census, the population was 15,331. Its county seat is Roseau. Roseau County borders the Canadian province of Manitoba.

Part of the Red Lake Indian Reservation is in Roseau County.

History
Roseau County was once the home of many Ojibwe, Sioux, and Mandan tribes. Archeologists have found artifacts within the county belonging to these tribes that date back 7,200 years. More recent history includes fur trappers and European-based explorers. By 1822, a fur-trading post was established in the area. In 1885, the future Roseau City hosted four settlers; by 1895 there were 600, and the area was incorporated as Roseau City.

By the mid-1880s the early settlers of eastern Kittson County were feeling the disadvantage of their location, far from the county seat, and petitioned the government for a separate county. On December 31, 1894, Governor Knute Nelson proclaimed the eastern portion of Kittson a new county, to be named Roseau. On February 11, 1896, the next governor, David Marston Clough, added part of Beltrami County to Roseau County. Roseau City was named the county seat.

Geography

Roseau County is in far northern Minnesota. Its northern boundary abuts Canada. The Roseau River drains the upper part of the county, flowing west into Kittson County on its way to the Hudson Bay. The county terrain consists of low rolling hills, devoted to agriculture, and dotted with lakes and drainages. There is considerable wooded area, especially in the southeast portion. Roseau is one of 17 Minnesota savanna counties with more savanna soils than prairie or forest soils.

Transportation

Airports
 Warroad International Memorial Airport (KRRT) - two miles northeast of Warroad
 Piney Pinecreek Border Airport - extends into Canada; serves as a limited airport of entry between the two nations.

Major highways

  Minnesota State Highway 11
  Minnesota State Highway 32
  Minnesota State Highway 89
  Minnesota State Highway 308
  Minnesota State Highway 310
  Minnesota State Highway 313

Adjacent counties and rural municipalities

 Rural Municipality of Stuartburn, Manitoba - northwest
 Rural Municipality of Piney, Manitoba - north
 Buffalo Point First Nation, Manitoba - northeast
 Lake of the Woods County - east
 Beltrami County - southeast
 Marshall County - south
 Kittson County - west

Protected areas

 Beltrami Island State Forest
 Hayes Lake State Park
 Lost River State Forest
 Luxemburg Peatland Scientific and Natural Area
 Roseau River State Wildlife Management Area
 Sprague Creek Peatland Scientific and Natural Area
 Two Rivers Aspen Park Scientific and Natural Area

Demographics

2000 census
As of the 2000 census, there were 16,338 people, 6,190 households, and 4,438 families in the county. The population density was 9.77/sqmi (3.77/km2). There were 7,101 housing units at an average density of 4.25/sqmi (1.64/km2). The racial makeup of the county was 95.92% White, 0.13% Black or African American, 1.42% Native American, 1.73% Asian, 0.02% Pacific Islander, 0.08% from other races, and 0.70% from two or more races.  0.43% of the population were Hispanic or Latino of any race. 41.0% were of Norwegian, 18.8% German and 10.7% Swedish ancestry.

There were 6,190 households, out of which 38.40% had children under the age of 18 living with them, 60.00% were married couples living together, 6.80% had a female householder with no husband present, and 28.30% were non-families. 24.60% of all households were made up of individuals, and 9.90% had someone living alone who was 65 years of age or older. The average household size was 2.60 and the average family size was 3.11.

The county population contained 29.80% under the age of 18, 6.80% from 18 to 24, 29.90% from 25 to 44, 20.80% from 45 to 64, and 12.60% who were 65 years of age or older. The median age was 35 years. For every 100 females there were 105.00 males. For every 100 females age 18 and over, there were 104.00 males.

The median income for a household in the county was $39,852, and the median income for a family was $46,185. Males had a median income of $29,747 versus $23,630 for females. The per capita income for the county was $17,053. About 4.60% of families and 6.60% of the population were below the poverty line, including 6.50% of those under age 18 and 12.20% of those age 65 or over.

2020 Census

Government and politics
In presidential elections, Roseau is Minnesota's most reliably Republican-voting county. John McCain's and George W. Bush's best performances in Minnesota were in Roseau County. Bush won it twice, with over 65% of the vote. It was also one of the few Minnesota counties that George H. W. Bush won in 1992 and Bob Dole won in 1996.

Roseau County is less reliably Republican in senatorial and gubernatorial elections. The Democratic-Farmer-Labor Party has won two senatorial elections here since 1992. Independents do not perform as well in Roseau County as in the rest of Minnesota. In the 1998 gubernatorial election, Norm Coleman's best performance in Minnesota was in Roseau County, where he won with almost 50% of the vote.

Communities

Cities

 Badger
 Greenbush
 Roosevelt (part)
 Roseau (county seat)
 Strathcona
 Warroad

Unincorporated communities

 Fox
 Mandus
 Pelan (part)
 Pencer
 Pinecreek
 Ross
 Salol
 Skime
 Swift
 Wannaska

Ghost towns
 Haug
 Winner

Townships

 Barnett Township
 Barto Township
 Beaver Township
 Cedarbend Township
 Deer Township
 Dewey Township
 Dieter Township
 Enstrom Township
 Falun Township
 Golden Valley Township
 Grimstad Township
 Hereim Township
 Huss Township
 Jadis Township
 Lake Township
 Laona Township
 Lind Township
 Malung Township
 Mickinock Township
 Moose Township
 Moranville Township
 Nereson Township
 Palmville Township
 Pohlitz Township
 Polonia Township
 Poplar Grove Township
 Reine Township
 Ross Township
 Skagen Township
 Soler Township
 Spruce Township
 Stafford Township
 Stokes Township

Unorganized territories
 North Roseau
 Northwest Roseau
 Southeast Roseau

See also
 National Register of Historic Places listings in Roseau County, Minnesota

References

External links
Official Roseau County website

 
Minnesota counties
1894 establishments in Minnesota
Populated places established in 1894